Tilottama Rajan (born 1951) is a Canadian scholar and Distinguished University Professor at the University of Western Ontario. She is Canada Research Chair and a Fellow of the Royal Society of Canada. Rajan is known for her research on Romantic literature, post-Kantian philosophy and contemporary theory.
She is the daughter of Balachandra Rajan.

Books
 Dark Interpreter: The Discourse of Romanticism, Cornell University Press, 1980
 The Supplement of Reading: Figures of Understanding in Romantic Theory and Practice, Cornell University Press, 1990
 Deconstruction and the Remainders of Phenomenology: Sartre, Derrida, Foucault, Baudrillard, Stanford University Press, 2002
 Romantic Narrative: Shelley, Hays, Godwin, Wollstonecraft, Johns Hopkins University Press, 2010

References

External links
Tilottama Rajan at the University of Western Ontario

Living people
Canadian academics of English literature
Academic staff of the University of Western Ontario
University of Toronto alumni
1951 births
University of Wisconsin–Madison faculty
Academic staff of Queen's University at Kingston
Canada Research Chairs
Canadian philosophers
Fellows of the Royal Society of Canada